Sanober  is a Middle Eastern female given name. Sanober means pine tree. Notable people with the name include:

 Sanober Kabir, Indian actress

Feminine given names
Pakistani feminine given names